Robert Bruce Waddell (November 27, 1914 – July 31, 1979) was an American politician.

Waddell was born in Dolton, Illinois. He went to the Thornton Township High School in Harvey, Illinois, Thornton Community College, and University of Illinois. Waddell served in the United States Military during World War II as a medical corpsman and medical administrative officer. Waddell lived with his wife and children in West Dundee, Illinois and was the president of the Taskmaster Equipment Company. Waddell was a Republican. He served in the Illinois House of Representatives from 1969 until his death in 1979. Waddell died from a heart attack while cutting wood at Island Lake in Sawyer County, Wisconsin while he was on vacation with his wife in Wisconsin.

Notes

1914 births
1979 deaths
People from Dolton, Illinois
People from West Dundee, Illinois
Military personnel from Illinois
South Suburban College alumni
University of Illinois alumni
Businesspeople from Illinois
Republican Party members of the Illinois House of Representatives
20th-century American politicians
20th-century American businesspeople